Songs 1 is the fifteenth studio album by the British singer-songwriter Judie Tzuke, released in 2007.

Many of the songs featured on the album were written with other recording artists, such as Ben Mark, David Saw and Gareth Gates, and have in fact appeared (or are due to appear) on their own albums.

The album features backing vocals by Tzuke's daughter Bailey Tzuke and appearances by other musicians, such as Gareth Gates on piano.

Track listing
 "Cup of Tea Song" (Judie Tzuke, Ben Mark)
 "All at Sea" (Judie Tzuke, David Saw)
 "Oh My Dayz" (Judie Tzuke, Ben Mark)
 "Dark Days" (Judie Tzuke, Gareth Gates)
 "Spin" (Judie Tzuke, Martin Terefe)
 "Jewel" (Judie Tzuke, David P Goodes)
 "We Don't" (Judie Tzuke, David Saw)
 "This Time" (Judie Tzuke, Ciara Newell, Graham Kearns)
 "Temporary" (Judie Tzuke, Jamie Norton)
 "That Kinda Love" (Judie Tzuke, David P Goodes)
 "Last Bus" (Judie Tzuke, Jamie Norton) Bonus Track

References
Official website

2007 albums
Judie Tzuke albums